Cremastocheilus is a genus of myermecophilic beetles in the family Scarabaeidae. There are at least 40 described species in Cremastocheilus.

See also
 List of Cremastocheilus species

References

Further reading

 Arnett, R.H. Jr., M. C. Thomas, P. E. Skelley and J. H. Frank. (eds.). (2002). American Beetles, Volume II: Polyphaga: Scarabaeoidea through Curculionoidea. CRC Press LLC, Boca Raton, FL.
 
 Richard E. White. (1983). Peterson Field Guides: Beetles. Houghton Mifflin Company.

External links

 NCBI Taxonomy Browser, Cremastocheilus

Cetoniinae